KXGN-TV (channel 5) is a television station in Glendive, Montana, United States, affiliated with CBS and NBC. It is owned by The Marks Group alongside radio stations KXGN (1400 AM) and KDZN (96.5 FM). The three stations share studios on South Douglas Street in downtown Glendive; KXGN-TV's transmitter is located at Makoshika State Park. The station also airs news and other programs from the Montana Television Network, a network of CBS affiliates in Montana.

KXGN-TV is the only television station in Glendive, reckoned as the smallest television market in the United States. Nielsen Media Research ranks it last of the 210 designated market areas for television in the United States, with just 3,900 households. Its status as the smallest station in the United States has earned it notoriety in the broadcasting industry; over its history, publications including the Los Angeles Times and Sports Illustrated have profiled KXGN-TV. The station's lone local program is a public affairs program covering issues in eastern Montana, though in the past it has produced limited local newscasts, and it does provide regional newscasts from the CBS and NBC affiliates in Billings.

History

Moore ownership
The founder of KXGN-TV was Lewis W. Moore, who had moved from Havre to Glendive in 1945 and owned the Rose Theater. In 1948, he started KXGN radio as a hedge against the possible decline of the movie theater business and to reach rural consumers with advertisements for his picture house in Glendive. Because of the radio station, Moore was well positioned to start a television station. On December 21, 1956, his Glendive Broadcasting Corporation filed with the Federal Communications Commission (FCC) to build a new TV station on channel 5 in Glendive, having previously asked for the channel to be authorized in addition to UHF channel 18. The FCC approved on March 13, 1957, and KXGN-TV began broadcasting on November 1.

From the beginning, it was clear that KXGN-TV would be a small station. In a 1959 United States Senate hearing in Helena which focused on the issue of cable television putting some small stations in the Mountain West out of business, Moore noted that KXGN's population served was the smallest "of any TV station in America, perhaps in the world". It initially had no network affiliation at all, struggling to produce five hours of live and filmed programming a day with a staff of nine. In 1962, salvation came when a receiving facility and microwave hookup were built east of Glendive at Wibaux to receive and send on programs from CBS affiliate KDIX-TV in Dickinson, North Dakota. The hookup allowed Moore to raise enough money to relocate the station to its present studio facilities, a former implement dealership, and a higher tower site in 1963.

Moore was also able to get ahead of the cable problem by purchasing a 50 percent stake in the cable system built to serve Glendive with television in 1968, and even after local viewers could subscribe to a choice in programming, KXGN remained popular because of its extensive community service orientation and unduplicated coverage of eastern Montana. By that time, ABC programs were off the schedule; the station had settled into its pattern for the next 40 years of being a primary CBS affiliate with selected NBC programs. CBS would later grant the station permission to air CBS programming from 6 to 9 p.m., as it does today, to improve ratings; this also allowed it to air NBC or other programming in the 9 p.m. hour. Local programming included live bingo five days a week during the winter months and local news specials as needed.

Sale to Marks
In 1988, Moore put KXGN radio and television on the market in order to complete his retirement. The move came at a tough time for the stations and the market they served. The Burlington Northern railroad had stopped operating through Glendive years prior; low oil prices depressed the region's energy sector; the worst drought since the 1930s negatively impacted the livestock and feed industries; and after Black Monday in 1987, national spot advertising sales dropped precipitously. To cut costs, KXGN dropped the Associated Press newswire, laid off staff, and canceled its public affairs show, the weekly Let's Talk About It. General manager "Dapper Dan" Frenzel, who had worked at the station since 1964, attempted to build a coalition of local buyers to take over the station, but they could not meet Moore's $1 million asking price. Instead, a Michigan man with a penchant for small-town TV struck a deal to purchase the KXGN stations in 1989. Stephen Marks owned WBKB-TV in Alpena, Michigan, also a single-station market, and said he liked one-station areas because they could command all of the available TV revenue in the area.

The sale took longer than Moore had expected because the FCC at the time had a rule that normally barred cross-ownership of radio and television stations. It was not until May 1990 that the FCC granted a waiver, noting the economic conditions inherent in the small-market stations, their extensively integrated operation, and the fact they had been co-owned for the television station's entire history. The commission also cited the availability of other electronic media through two Glendive-licensed radio stations, six other signals, and the cable system (which Moore sold off in 1986), as well as a daily newspaper. Marks added KDZN in 1995; the FCC approved of the purchase of the FM station because of the substantial losses that KXGN AM, then supported entirely by the TV station, and KDZN had incurred in the region's continuing poor economy. KXGN also aired some Fox programming, primarily the NFL on Fox, when Fox gained football rights from CBS in 1994.

Frenzel died of a heart condition in 2003 and was replaced by Paul Sturlaugson as general manager.

Digital television transition
Sturlaugson's most pressing challenge in the 2000s was leading the station through its costly upgrade to digital television. If not for the DTV Delay Act pushing the final cutoff date back by four months from February to June 2009, KXGN-TV would not have converted in a timely manner, as the equipment had not arrived by February. While many stations had a May 1, 2002, deadline to start a digital signal, KXGN-TV requested and received multiple extensions due to financial hardship. In 2008, the FCC had permitted it to convert to digital on VHF channel 5 instead of the originally allocated channel 10, a process that saved money but delayed installation of the facility. After the successful digital conversion, in September 2009, KXGN added a dedicated NBC subchannel, an idea Sturlaugson had discussed prior to the transition; Marks had previously signed KXGN up to carry the never-launched .2 Network in 2008. The station's various translators were converted to digital service by their operators in the years that followed; for instance, the retransmitters at Plevna were converted at the end of 2011, also expanding the reach of the NBC subchannel.

Marks died on May 11, 2022; his company The Marks Group had 14 radio stations and five TV stations (including KXGN-TV) at the time of his death.

Programming

CBS

KXGN-TV's CBS subchannel (5.1) clears the entire CBS schedule. Some CBS programs—particularly CBS Mornings, The Price Is Right, and Let's Make a Deal—are aired one hour ahead of their usual Mountain Time Zone airings. The CBS Evening News is aired at 5:00 p.m. instead of 5:30 p.m. to accommodate the KTVQ 5:30 p.m. newscast. Even after dropping NBC from its primary subchannel, KXGN has retained the 6:00 p.m. to 9:00 p.m. CBS prime time block intact, opting to show syndicated programming at 9:00 p.m.

Since 1990, KXGN-TV has been a formal member of the Montana Television Network (MTN), airing the noon and evening newscasts of KTVQ in Billings and contributing Eastern Montana news to MTN.

NBC
The NBC subchannel (5.2) airs NBC programming generally in pattern for the Mountain Time Zone. Regional newscasts from KULR-TV in Billings, with the exception of the first hour of its morning newscast, Wake Up Montana, are also shown live.

Local news
KXGN aired a daily evening local newscast under various titles, including Action 5 News and Montana East News, until 2015. (The title Action 5 News was used in the 1980s when Terry Kegley anchored the newscast; he also chose the name.) The newsgathering and production was often a one-person operation in which the anchor conducted interviews for the newscast and then produced the program with one studio camera. Former longtime personality Ed Agre, who joined KXGN in 1993, was once profiled by Sports Illustrated for his duties in this capacity, including traveling to produce high school sports shows.

In the later years of the newscast's operation, Emilie Boyles served as the station's sole reporter and editor. By that time, the five-minute newscast aired at 9:55 p.m. and 7:25 a.m., the following day, on KXGN's CBS subchannel and 4:55 p.m. on KXGN's NBC subchannel. The local newscast was cancelled in 2015; since then, the only local production on KXGN has been Let's Talk About It, a half-hour public affairs program that airs on Sundays on both of KXGN's subchannels. It also airs on KXGN and KDZN radio as well as Marks-owned KGCX in Sidney.

Technical information

Subchannels
The station's digital signal is multiplexed:

Translators
Like many other Montana stations, KXGN relies heavily on a mix of broadcast translators and cable TV systems to extend its reach to more viewers, many of them outside of the defined Glendive market, from Ekalaka in the south to Scobey and Plentywood in the north.

 Baker: K27LT-D
 Circle: K16GP-D
 Culbertson: K34GY-D
 Ekalaka: K13LN-D
 Plentywood: K28OB-D
 Plevna: K03HD-D
 Poplar: K05KK-D, K17MS-D
 Scobey: K13MA-D
 Sidney–Fairview: K13IG-D

References

External links 

Montana Television Network
CBS network affiliates
Television channels and stations established in 1957
1957 establishments in Montana
XGN-TV
Dawson County, Montana
NBC network affiliates